Dollars and Dimes is the fifth album by American singer/songwriter Owen Temple. It was released June 9, 2009 on El Paisano Records.  A concept album focused on hard times in different regions of North America, that the Chicago Sun-Times stated "delivers the concept richly".

Track listing
All songs (Temple) except where noted
"Broken Heart Land" (Temple, Jeff Burkhart, Gordy Quist)– 3:32 
"Black Diamond" (Temple, Adam Carroll, Scott Nolan)– 2:58 
"Making a Life" (Temple, Gordy Quist, Chris Anderson) – 3:38 
"City of the King" (Temple, Gordy Quist, Evan Christian)– 4:15 
"Dollars and Dimes" (Temple, Adam Carroll)– 3:11
"Memphis" – 3:10
"Los Angeles" – 2:49 
"I Don't Want to Do What I Do" (Temple, Adam Carroll)– 3:14 
"Quiet Look" – 3:15
"Golden Age" (Temple, Gordy Quist)– 3:35 
"Winnipeg Waltz" – 3:06

Credits

Musicians
 Owen Temple - Vocals, acoustic 
 Gabriel Rhodes - Acoustic, electric guitar, pump organ, piano, ukulele  
 Will Sexton - Bass, electric guitar, harmony vocals 
 Hunt Sales - Drums, electric guitar, percussion  
 Brian Standefer - Cello
 Michael Thompson - Piano
 Adam Carroll - Harmonica

Production
Produced by Gabe Rhodes
Engineered by Cris Burns
Recorded at Bumshoe Music Services, Austin, Texas

Artwork
Art Direction/Design by Lance Schriner
Photography by Jonathan Lurie
Photography by Philip Albert Shane

Charts

Releases

External links 
Owen Temple website

References 

Owen Temple albums
2009 albums